13th TFCA Awards
December 16, 2009

Best Film: 
 Hunger    Inglourious Basterds 
The 13th Toronto Film Critics Association Awards, honoring the best in film for 2009, were given on December 16, 2009.

Winners
Best Actor:
Nicolas Cage – Bad Lieutenant: Port of Call New Orleans 
Runners-Up: George Clooney – Up in the Air, Michael Fassbender – Hunger, Colin Firth – A Single Man and Viggo Mortensen – The Road

Best Actress:
Carey Mulligan – An Education
Runners-Up: Arta Dobroshi – Lorna's Silence and Meryl Streep – Julie & Julia

Best Animated Film: 
Fantastic Mr. Fox
Runners-Up: Coraline and Up

Best Director: 
Kathryn Bigelow – The Hurt Locker
Runners-Up: Steve McQueen – Hunger and Quentin Tarantino – Inglourious Basterds

Best Documentary Film: 
The Cove
Runners-Up: Anvil! The Story of Anvil and The Beaches of Agnès

Best Film (tie):
Hunger
Inglourious Basterds
Runner-Up: The Hurt Locker

Best First Feature: 
Hunger
Runners-Up: District 9 and (500) Days of Summer

Best Foreign Language Film: 
The White Ribbon • Austria
Runner-Up: Police, Adjective • Romania and Summer Hours • France

Best Screenplay (tie):
Inglourious Basterds – Quentin Tarantino 
Up in the Air – Jason Reitman and Sheldon Turner
Runner-Up: A Serious Man – Joel and Ethan Coen

Best Supporting Actor:
Christoph Waltz – Inglourious Basterds
Runners-Up: Christian McKay – Me and Orson Welles and Timothy Olyphant – A Perfect Getaway

Best Supporting Actress:
Anna Kendrick – Up in the Air
Runners-Up: Vera Farmiga – Up in the Air and Mo'Nique – Precious

Jay Scott Prize for Emerging Talent:
Xavier Dolan
Rogers Canadian Film Award:
Polytechnique
Runners-Up: The Necessities of Life and Pontypool

References

2009
2009 film awards
Tor
2009 in Toronto